Eshaqabad (also Romanized as Esḩāqābād) is a village in Neyasar Rural District, Neyasar District, Kashan County, Isfahan Province, Iran. At the 2006 census, its population was 303, in 93 families.

References 

Populated places in Kashan County